Bhoot Returns is a 2012 Indian Hindi 3D horror film directed by Ram Gopal Varma and written by Ravi Shankar. The film was released on 12 October 2012 to mixed reviews.

The film stars Manisha Koirala, J. D. Chakravarthy, Madhu Shalini and Alayana Sharma in the lead role. Although advertised as a sequel to the 2003 film Bhoot, also directed by Varma, the two film's do not have any connection with one another and have complete different plots A further sequel, Bhoot 3 is in production.

Plot 
Tarun, an architect, moves into a luxurious bungalow with his wife, Namrata, and their children, 10-year-old Taman and 6-year-old Nimmi. During an exploration of the house, Nimmi finds a doll, and includes someone named 'Shabbu' in all her activities. The family mistakes Nimmi's new doll to be Shabbu but are surprised when Nimmi points to an empty space and introduces her invisible friend as Shabbu. Her parents suspect her wild imagination as the reason for her new 'friend'.

Soon, Tarun's younger sister, Pooja, surprises the family with a visit. As Tarun, Namrata and Pooja discuss Nimmi's fixation over Shabbu, the family servant, Laxman, is sure of a spirit's presence in the house. Laxman's worries receive severe backlash from Tarun, an ardent skeptic. Soon, each night at the bungalow seems to turn for the worse, with knocks at unearthly hours, demonic sounds and eerie movements. Tarun suspects Laxman to be the mischief-maker, trying to prove his points. As Nimmi's fixation with Shabbu increases, the family decides to consult a psychiatrist. The psychiatrist explains Nimmi's imaginary friend as a result of her loneliness and terms it as a common technique used by children to grab attention.

Laxman's sudden disappearance and the increasing curiosity in Pooja to find answers for the ongoing activities make her install wireless cameras at various places in the house, which record Nimmi playing with what seems like a ghostly apparition. Tarun's mind starts reeling as he sees the captured footage; it is proof enough for the disturbed family to finally decide to leave the house. But the house has other plans: Nimmi is found missing the next morning. The police are called in to investigate but they consider the family delusional and do not take much interest in the matter.

Tarun receives a mysterious phone call, Nimmi's voice from the upper floor, after which they find Laxman murdered. The house seems to be on lock-down and the phones jammed. Taman is mysteriously killed. Nimmi appears possessed by the spirit and tries to kill both her parents, until she's finally burned and defeated with Pooja's help, as the remaining family flee, bloody and injured. Nimmi comes out from the building in low angle, then introduces herself as Shabbu to the neighborhood children.

Cast 
Manisha Koirala as Namrata Awasthi
J. D. Chakravarthy as Tarun Awasthi
Madhu Shalini as Pooja
 Alayana Sharma as Nimmi
Bharat Ganeshpure as Police Inspector
 Nitin Jadhav as Laxman
 Kushank Thacker as Taman

Marketing 
The first-look poster was released September 2012. It depicts a girl with four eyes and two noses in an optical illusion-styled photograph. The poster, however, was termed as a "blatant copy" and a rip-off of a campaign poster made by a Mumbai-based ad agency to spread awareness against drunken driving.

Official trailer 
The first trailer premiered in theaters with the release of Raaz 3. It features a little girl playing with a spirit in the living room, the scene being captured on webcam. The trailer was certified an "A" rating from the Censor Board of India.

Critical reception 

The film received to mixed to negative reviews. Rajeev Masand of CNN-IBN said the film is time-pass entertainment, as Varma succeeds in keeping you on the edge, and the film does deliver a few good scares in 3D. Madhureeta Mukherjee of Times of India gave it 2 stars. "We did leave with one horrifying thought though – of this Bhoot returning (in a third instalment). Hellllppp!!!" said ToI. Rediff Movies said "Bhoot Returns has quite a few nail-biting moments but ends abruptly" and gave it 2.5 star. Roshni Devi of Koimoi gave it 0.5 star "This Bhoot had no business returning. RGV could have at least saved the original Bhoot from being ruined by trying to make a sequel out of it." wrote Roshni Devi. Social Movie Rating site MOZVO gave it a rating of 2.4 putting it in 'Below Average' category. Taran Adarsh of Bollywood Hungama gave it 1.5 stars. Kanika Sikka of DNA gave it 1.5 stars. Rohan J.Tambe of Independent Bollywood gave it 1.5 stars and said "Save your money and time by skipping this movie.The film was then given a U/A certificate"

Franchise 
In 2020 Karan Johar's Dharma Productions acquired the rights of Bhoot Franchise, To make their own Bhoot Franchise, first part was Bhoot – Part One: The Haunted Ship starring Vicky Kaushal, Ashutosh Rana, and Bhumi Pednekar, directed by Bhanu Pratap Singh. Karan Johar revealed that he want to make his own Bhoot trilogy.

References

External links 
 Bhoot Returns Official Site
 

Indian 3D films
Indian ghost films
2010s Hindi-language films
2012 films
2012 horror films
Indian horror films
Indian sequel films
Films directed by Ram Gopal Varma
2012 3D films
Films scored by Sandeep Chowta
Hindi-language horror films